Panzer Battles may refer to:

 Panzer Battles (book), a 1956 memoir
 Panzer Battles (video game), a 1989 video game